Hatton National Bank PLC (commonly abbreviated as HNB) is a private bank in Sri Lanka with 255 branches and 794 ATMs. The bank traces its origin to 1888 when Hatton Bank commenced its operations in Hatton, Sri Lanka.

See also

 List of banks in Sri Lanka
 List of companies listed on the Colombo Stock Exchange

References

External links
 Official website

1888 establishments in Ceylon
Banks of Sri Lanka
Banks established in 1888
Companies listed on the Colombo Stock Exchange